Rahman Sidek  (born 20 September 1965) is a former badminton player from Malaysia and coach.

Personal life
He is the 4th child of the 5 legendary Sidek brothers who represented Malaysia in the sport of badminton internationally. Rahman and his siblings gained exposure about badminton sport from their father, Haji Mohd Sidek. Under the guidance of his father, Rahman and the rest of his siblings were trained to be champions. Furthermore, Rahman is one of the alumnus of Victoria Institution (batch 1978–1982) amongst the batch of Malaysia's prominent sportsmen who also attended that school just like him.

Career     
He is an international doubles player during the late 1980s to early 1990s. He managed to win a number of international title such as the Canadian Open and German Open with partner Ong Ewe Chye. Rahman Sidek was a member in the winning team at the Thomas Cup 1992. He retired because his partner quit the sport.

Coaching
After he retired, he was appointed as Malaysian national doubles coach. Then, he and his brothers established a badminton club to find new talented players, called Nusa Mahsuri. He has been coaching in Nusa Mahsuri, the first professional badminton club in Malaysia from 1996 until now.

Achievements

Asian Championships 
Men's doubles

Southeast Asian Games 
Men's doubles

IBF World Grand Prix 
The World Badminton Grand Prix sanctioned by International Badminton Federation (IBF) from 1983 to 2006.

Men's doubles

Honour
  :
 Member of the Order of the Defender of the Realm (A.M.N.) (1992)

See also
 Misbun Sidek
 Razif Sidek
 Jalani Sidek
 Rashid Sidek

References

1966 births
Living people
People from Selangor
Malaysian Muslims
Malaysian people of Malay descent
Malaysian male badminton players
Southeast Asian Games medalists in badminton
Southeast Asian Games gold medalists for Malaysia
Southeast Asian Games bronze medalists for Malaysia
Members of the Order of the Defender of the Realm
Competitors at the 1987 Southeast Asian Games
Competitors at the 1989 Southeast Asian Games